District 27 of the Oregon State Senate comprises parts of Deschutes County. It is currently represented by Republican Tim Knopp of Bend.

Election results
District boundaries have changed over time, therefore, senators before 2013 may not represent the same constituency as today. From 1993 until 2003 and from 2003 until 2013 it covered a slightly different area in central Oregon.

References

27
Deschutes County, Oregon